Commandant L'Herminier (F791) is a  in the French Navy.

Design 

Armed by a crew of 90 sailors, these vessels have the reputation of being among the most difficult in bad weather. Their high windage makes them particularly sensitive to pitch and roll as soon as the sea is formed.

Their armament, consequent for a vessel of this tonnage, allows them to manage a large spectrum of missions. During the Cold War, they were primarily used to patrol the continental shelf of the Atlantic Ocean in search of Soviet Navy submarines. Due to the poor performance of the hull sonar, as soon as an echo appeared, the reinforcement of an ASM frigate was necessary to chase it using its towed variable depth sonar.

Their role as patrollers now consists mainly of patrols and assistance missions, as well as participation in UN missions (blockades, flag checks) or similar marine policing tasks (fight against drugs, extraction of nationals, fisheries control, etc.). The mer-mer 38 or mer-mer 40 missiles have been landed, but they carry several machine guns and machine guns, more suited to their new missions.

Its construction cost was estimated at 270,000,000 French francs.

Construction and career 
Commandant L'Herminier was laid down on 7 May 1979 at Arsenal de Lorient, Lorient. Launched on 7 March 1981 and commissioned on 19 January 1986.

In 1987, she participated in Mission Corymbe off the Gulf of Guinea.

In 2009, the rocket launcher was removed and replaced by a VSAT satellite transmission system. Possessing all its underwater and surface detection capabilities, it essentially provides support missions for the Strategic Oceanic Force (FOST) and patrol on the Atlantic coast. It can be deployed as part of a sovereignty mission.

At the end of 2010, the ship fulfilled her missions within the naval action force.

She was decommissioned on 7 March 2018.

Citations 

Ships built in Lorient
1981 ships
D'Estienne d'Orves-class avisos